Hualikan station is a station on Line 15 of the Beijing Subway.

Station Layout 
The station has an elevated island platform.

Exits 
There are 4 exits, lettered A, B, C, and D. Exits A and B are accessible.

References

External links 

Beijing Subway stations in Shunyi District
Railway stations in China opened in 2010